Acid is a 2018 Russian drama film directed by Alexander Gorchilin. In June 2018, the film participated in the Kinotavr film festival debut competition, where Gorchilin was awarded the prize for best film. The film premiered in Russia on October 4, 2018 and in Berlin, Germany on February 8, 2019.

Plot 
Sasha (Filipp Avdeev) and Petya (Aleksandr Kuznetsov) live the crazy life of young musicians in modern-day Moscow: loud parties, ups and downs, the wheel of unstable relationships with others and themselves. Knowing the importance of love, family, and opportunity, but feeling lonely and disconnected, has left them both with a sense that they are corroding from the inside. Suddenly an event occurs in their lives that requires them both to take an honest look at themselves.

Cast
 Filipp Avdeyev as Sasha
Aleksandr Kuznetsov as Petya
 Aleksandra Rebenok as Sasha's mother
 Anastasia Yevgrafova as Lyubochka
 Yevgenia Sheveleva as Girl
 Pyotr Skvortsov as Ivan
 Daniela Stojanovic as the Ivan's mother

Awards and nominations
 Kinotavr — Best Debut (Alexander Gorchilin): won 
2018 SUBTITLE Spotlight European Film Festival — Angela Award for role as Petya (Aleksandr Kuznetsov): won 
Russian Guild of Film Critics — Best Supporting Actress (Aleksandra Rebenok), Best Debut (Aleksandr Gorchilin, Sabina Eremeeva,  Natella Krapivina): nominated
GoEast Film Festival — Golden Lilly for Best Film (Alexander Gorchilin, Sabina Eremeeva,  Natella Krapivina)

References

External links 
 

2018 films
2010s Russian-language films
Russian drama films
2018 drama films